In architecture, a pendentive is a constructional device permitting the placing of a circular dome over a square room or of an elliptical dome over a rectangular room. The pendentives, which are triangular segments of a sphere, taper to points at the bottom and spread at the top to establish the continuous circular or elliptical base needed for a dome. In masonry the pendentives thus receive the weight of the dome, concentrating it at the four corners where it can be received by the piers beneath.

Prior to the pendentive's development, builders used the device of corbelling or  squinches in the corners of a room. Pendentives commonly occurred in  Orthodox, Renaissance, and Baroque churches, with a drum with windows often inserted between the pendentives and the dome. The first experimentation with pendentives began with Roman dome construction in the 2nd–3rd century AD, while full development of the form came in the 6th-century  Eastern Roman Hagia Sophia at Constantinople.

Gallery

See also
 History of Italian Renaissance domes
 Spandrel

References

Sources 
 
 

Arches and vaults